Methanolobus profundi is a mesophilic, methylotrophic methanogen archaeon. The type strain is MobMT (=DSM 21213T =NBRC 104158T). It was isolated from a deep subsurface gas field.

References

Further reading

External links

LPSN
Type strain of Methanolobus profundi at BacDive -  the Bacterial Diversity Metadatabase

Euryarchaeota